Abul Kalam Azad Siddiqui is a Bangladesh Nationalist Party politician and the former Member of Parliament of Tangail-7.

Career
Siddiqui was elected to parliament from Tangail-7 as a Bangladesh Nationalist Party candidate in 1996. After that, he lost to Awami league candidate Md. Akabbar Hossain in 2001 and 2008.

References

Bangladesh Nationalist Party politicians
Living people
6th Jatiya Sangsad members
7th Jatiya Sangsad members
Year of birth missing (living people)